Korean drums play an important part in traditional Korean music, ranging from folk music to royal court music. There are a wide variety of shapes and sizes, for use both in accompanying other instruments and in special drumming performances.

In the traditional Korean classification of instruments, drums are grouped with the hyeokbu (혁부), or instruments made with leather. A notable class of these leather drums are Korean barrel drums.

History
During the Joseon period, many types of drums were used for the royal court music, including the janggu, jwago, yonggo, gyobanggo, jingo, jeolgo, nogo, and others. Among these, the janggu was also used for folk music, and later became the most commonly used drum used in Korean music.

Types
Buk (hangul: 북) - Double-headed shallow barrel drum used in folk music and played with one stick or one hand and one stick; varieties of buk are used in pansori, pungmul, and samulnori
Janggu or Janggo (hangul: 장고 or 장구; hanja: 杖鼓 or 長鼓) - A double-headed hourglass-shaped drum generally played with one stick and one hand
Galgo (hangul: 갈고; hanja: 羯鼓) - Double-headed hourglass-shaped drum similar to the janggo but played with two sticks and thinner drum heads; sometimes called yanggo or yangjanggo; no longer commonly used 
Jingo (hangul: 진고; hanja: 晉鼓) - Largest barrel drum
Jeolgo (hangul: 절고;) - Barrel drum
Jwago (hangul: 좌고;) - A barrel drum in a wooden frame
Geongo (hangul: 건고;) - Huge barrel drum
Yonggo (hangul: 용고;) - A barrel drum with a dragon painted on its shell; used in daechwita
Eunggo (hangul: 응고;) - Barrel drum suspended from a frame
Sakgo - (hangul: 삭고;) - A long barrel drum suspended from a wooden frame
Gyobanggo (hangul: 교방고;) - Flat drum suspended from a frame
Junggo (hangul: 중고;) - Flat drum suspended from a frame; similar to the gyobanggo but larger
Sogo (hangul: 소고;) - A small hand-held drum
Nogo (hangul: 노고;) - A set of two drums pierced by a pole
Nodo (hangul: 노도;) - A set of two small drums on a pole, which is twisted to play; used in ritual music
Yeongdo (hangul: 노도; hanja:) - Four drums on a pole, which is twisted to play; used in ritual music
Noedo (hangul: 뇌도;)) - six small drums hung in a frame; used in ritual music
Noego (hangul: 뇌고;) - Three small barrel drums on a pole, which is twisted to play; used in ritual music
Do (도) - single pellet drum on a pole

Gallery

See also
Traditional Korean musical instruments

References

The New Grove Dictionary of Music and Musicians, 2nd ed. S.v. "Puk," by Robert C. Provine.

Bibliography

 Samguk Sagi
 Goryeosa
 Book of Sui
 Akhak Gwebeom

External links
Buk page from NCKTPA site

Video
Video showing sori-buk used in pansori
Video showing pungmul-buk used in samulnori
Video showing yonggo used in daechwita

Drums
Korean musical instruments